Kurukkoli Moideen  is a politician from Kerala, India. He represents Tirur (State Assembly constituency) in 15th Kerala State Legislative Assembly. He belongs to Indian Union Muslim League.

Personal life 
Kurukkoli Moideen was born on 1 November 1959 at Valavannur in Malappuram district, Kerala. His father is Kunjalan. His wife Nafeesa is a home-maker. He did his secondary education from GVHSS Kalpakanchery.

Political career 
Kurukkoli Moideen entered politics through his activism in Muslim Students Federation. He then became an active politician from Indian Union Muslim League. In 2010, he won elections to Valavannur Grama Panchayath. He has served as Tanur Block Panchayat President in 2015 and as the chairman of district panchayat standing committee. In May 2021, he won the Kerala Assembly Elections from Tirur (State Assembly) constituency.

He has assumed various organisational positions in Indian Union Muslim League. It includes the state presidency of IUML's Swathanthra Karshaka Sangham and the editorship of Swathanthra Karshakan, a magazine published by IUML's farmers front. He has also made contributions in cooperative movement. He has held the presidency of Valavannur Service Co-operative Bank and vice presidency of Malappuram District Co-operative Bank.

He supports the demand for the formation of Tirur district in Kerala by taking out the coastal regions in Malappuram. He says, a new district would attend the question of development deficit in Malappuram district substantively.

2021 Kerala State Assembly Election 
Kurukkoli Moideen defeated Gafoor P. Lillis from CPI(M) in 2021 assembly elections in Tirur (State Assembly) constituency. He secured a vote share of 48.21% and a winning margin of 7214 votes.

References 

People from Malappuram district
Living people
Indian Union Muslim League politicians
Kerala Legislative Assembly
Kerala MLAs 2021–2026
1959 births